Camponotus subbarbatus. also known as bearded carpenter ants, is a species of ant in the family Formicidae. The ant is native to eastern North America.

References

Further reading

 

subbarbatus
Articles created by Qbugbot
Insects described in 1893